Tatiana Gabrielle Hobson (born January 25, 1996) is an American actress. She is known for her roles as Gaia on The CW science fiction television series The 100, Prudence on the Netflix original series Chilling Adventures of Sabrina, and Marienne Bellamy on the Netflix series You. She also provided the voice of Willow Park on the Disney animated series The Owl House, and played Jo Braddock in the 2022 movie Uncharted and Hannah Kim on the Netflix series Kaleidoscope.

Early life and education
Hobson was born on January 25, 1996, in San Francisco, California. She is one of three children born to Traci (née Hewitt) and Terry Hobson. Her father is African American, and her mother was born in Korea to a Korean woman and African American soldier. At age four, her mother was adopted by an African American military family that was stationed in Japan at the time.

Hobson began acting in the third grade, in an adaptation of Lemony Snicket's A Series of Unfortunate Events, where she played the main role of Lemony Snicket. She auditioned for Oakland School for the Arts in middle school and was accepted into their theatre program. She has performed in and directed several productions and has won multiple awards for her work at various theatre festivals, including the Edinburgh Festival Fringe in Scotland. 

Hobson graduated from Oakland School for the Arts with a 3.7 GPA. She moved to Atlanta after high school to attend Spelman College, where she majored in drama and French.

Career
Gabrielle's first credit was under the name Tatiana Hobson, in the 2014 short film To Stay the Sword. In 2015, Gabrielle moved to Los Angeles. She starred in the 2015 short film Tatterdemalion and the 2016 television film Just Jenna as Monique.

Her first credit as Tati Gabrielle came in 2016 for her guest role as Wackie Jackie in the "Tightrope of Doom" episode of the Disney Channel comedy series K.C. Undercover. Later that year, Gabrielle also starred in Nickelodeon's The Thundermans in the episode "Stealing Home" as Hacksaw.

In 2017, Gabrielle landed her first recurring role as Gaia in The CW apocalyptic drama The 100. That same year, she was featured in an episode titled "Bob" of the Hulu anthology series Dimension 404, where she portrayed Amanda's sister. Gabrielle also voiced Addie in the 2017 film The Emoji Movie, her first major film role, and recurred in the second season of Hulu's Freakish as Birdie and on the TBS animated series Tarantula.

In March 2018, Gabrielle was cast as a series regular in the role of Prudence in the Netflix original series, Chilling Adventures of Sabrina. In 2020, Gabrielle was cast as Marienne Bellamy on the third season of the Netflix psychological thriller series You, and reprised her role on the fourth season. In 2022, Gabrielle starred as the villain Jo Braddock in the film Uncharted.

Filmography

References

External links
 

1996 births
Living people
Actresses from San Francisco
African-American actresses
American actresses of Korean descent
Spelman College alumni
American child models